The Strawn Historic Agricultural District is a U.S. historic district (designated as such on September 13, 1993) located in DeLeon Springs, Florida. The district is bounded by Broderick and Retta Streets and by Central and Dundee Avenues. It contains 17 historic buildings.

References

External links
Volusia County listings at National Register of Historic Places

National Register of Historic Places in Volusia County, Florida
Historic districts on the National Register of Historic Places in Florida